The county governor of Nord-Trøndelag county in Norway represented the central government administration in the county. The county of Nordre Trondhjems amt (re-named Nord-Trøndelag in 1919) was established by royal resolution on 24 September 1804 when the old Trondhjems amt was divided in two. The county existed until 1 January 2018 when the two counties were merged once again.

The county governor is the government's representative in the county. The governor carries out the resolutions and guidelines of the Storting and government. This is done first by the county governor performing administrative tasks on behalf of the ministries. Secondly, the county governor also monitors the activities of the municipalities and is the appeal body for many types of municipal decisions.

History
The first county governor in Nordre Trondhjem, Caspar Conrad Rafn, lived in Verdal, as this was decreed to the county capital. Rafn's successor Christen Elster settled in Inderøy and made that his seat. In 1818, the state bought Sund farm in Inderøy and this began an almost eighty-year period with Inderøy as the county capital. Elster did not live at Sund, but his four successors lived and held an office there. When Ole Anton Qvam became governor in 1894, he lived at the Gjævran farm in Egge (now part of Steinkjer) and he moved the county seat to that location. The Sund farm in Inderøy was sold in 1900.

The county manor house in Steinkjer, "Eggeli", was designed by the Trondheim architect Axel Guldahl and was built in 1919 under the leadership of Gov. Halvor Bachke Guldahl. Guldahl had previously lived at Ølvisheim, and had offices there. The work of moving the office space from a rural office and into urban areas can be seen as part of a major urbanization process in society. Eggeli was the seat of the county until 1945. The building was then just the residence for county governors until 1986, when the county moved away from providing a governor's residence.

From 1948 until 1962,the county governor's office was at Føinumgården in Elvegata 1 in the town of Steinkjer. From 1962, the office moved into the county municipality's newly built office building at Ogndalsvegen 2, also in the town center. The state house in Steinkjer was completed in 1988, at the southern end of the city center, and it houses both the county governor and the chambers for the Nord-Trøndelag County Municipality councilors as well as for several other regional state agencies.

Nord-Trøndelag merged with Sør-Trøndelag county on 1 January 2018. The new county governor for Trøndelag will continue to live and work in the town of Steinkjer.

List of county governors
The following is a list of the county governors of Nord-Trøndelag:

For the county governors of this area before 1804, see List of county governors of Trøndelag.
For the county governors of this area after 2017, see List of county governors of Trøndelag.

References

Nord-Trondelag